Mumba Kalifungwa, is a Zambian accountant and corporate executive, who is the managing director and chief executive officer of Absa Bank Uganda Limited, a commercial bank in Uganda, whose assets were valued at US$665 million in December 2017. He took up this assignment on 1 April 2020.

Background and education
He was born in Zambia. He attended local primary and secondary schools, before being admitted to university for his bachelor's degree. His second degree, a Master of Business Administration, was obtained from Heriot-Watt University Business School, in Edinburgh, Scotland, United Kingdom. Kalifungwa is also a Chartered Certified Accountant, recognised by the Association of Chartered Certified Accountants. In addition, he has taken courses in banking and management over the duration of his career.

Career
At the time he was appointed CEO of Absa Bank Uganda, Kalifungwa was the chief financial officer (CFO) at Absa Bank Botswana Limited, a position he served in since 2015. Before that, he served as the CFO at then Barclays Bank of Zambia (now Absa Bank Zambia). His banking career goes back to 1995. He started out at Coopers and Lybrand which today is PricewaterhouseCoopers. Later, he joined the Zambia Revenue Authority, serving there as senior accountant. He then joined Absa Bank Zambia.

On 1 April 2020, Kalifungwa replaced Nazim Mahmood, who held the CEO position at Absa Bank Uganda, in acting capacity since July 2019.

Professional associations and societies
Mumba Kalifungwa is a fellow of the Chartered Institute of Management Accountants, the Association of Chartered Certified Accountants, the  Botswana Institute of Chartered Accountants and the Zambia Institute of Chartered Accountants. As of March 2020, he was a board member of the Chartered Institute of Management Accountants (CIMA) Africa Board. He previously served as chairman of the board audit committee of the Zambia Institute of Mass Communication.

See also
 Absa Group
 List of banks in Uganda

References

External links
 Website of Absa Bank Uganda Limited
 Brief Profile

1970s births
Living people
Zambian bankers
Zambian accountants
Zambian business executives
Zambian businesspeople
Zambian chief executives
University of Zambia alumni	
Alumni of Heriot-Watt University
Fellows of the Association of Chartered Certified Accountants
Absa people